A chamois (Rupicapra rupicapra) is a species of goat-antelope native to Europe.

Chamois may also refer to:

 Chamois, Aosta Valley, a place in Italy
 Chamois, Missouri, a place in the United States
 Chamois leather
 In cycling, clothing items traditionally made with chamois leather:
 Cycling shorts
 Cycling pad
 Chamois Niortais FC, a football team
 Singer Chamois, a British car
 , a Panamanian steamship in service 1949-58

See also
 Stage Manager (internally codenamed Chamois), a feature on iPadOS 16
 Chamoisee, a color found on some goats
 Chamoy (disambiguation)
 Shamwari, a game reserve in South Africa